Saul Kussiel Padover (April 13, 1905 – February 22, 1981) was a historian and political scientist at the New School for Social Research in New York City who wrote biographies of philosophers and politicians such as Karl Marx and Thomas Jefferson.

Early years and education 

Padover was born in Rozwadów, then in Austria-Hungary, but now in Poland. He emigrated to the United States in 1920. Padover earned a Bachelor of Arts degree from Wayne State University in Detroit, Michigan. He completed graduate coursework at Yale University in New Haven, Connecticut and received a Master of Arts and in 1932. He later received a Ph.D. from the University of Chicago.

Civil Service 

Padover worked in the United States Department of Interior, as a political analyst for the Federal Communications Commission, and as an intelligence officer for the Office of Strategic Services. Padover supervised civilian members of the Psychological Warfare Division (PWD). His service was notable for his leaking the identity of U.S.-appointed mayor of Aachen Franz Oppenhoff; Heinrich Himmler subsequently ordered the assassination of Oppenhoff.

Academia and writing career 

Padover wrote editorials for PM, a short-lived liberal newspaper.

In 1949, he joined the graduate faculty of The New School. He also directed the General Seminar, the New School's interdisciplinary seminar for faculty.

Personal life and death 

Padover was married first to Irina Padover, and following the death of his first wife, to Peg Fenwick, screenwriter of the film All That Heaven Allows.

Padover died on February 22, 1981.

Selected works 

The Life and Death of Louis XVI. D. Appleton-Century, 1939.
Jefferson: A Great American's Life and Ideas. Harcourt, Brace, 1942.
Experiment in Germany. The Story of an American Intelligence Officer (1946), New York: Duell, Sloane and Pearce

The Complete Madison. Harper, 1953.
A Jefferson Profile: As Revealed in His Letters. John Day, 1956.
Confessions and Self-Portraits. John Day, 1957.
The Mind of Alexander Hamilton. Harper, 1958. 
The Genius of America. McGraw-Hill, 1960.
The Meaning of Democracy: An Appraisal of the American Experience. (1963)
Karl Marx: An Intimate Biography. McGraw-Hill, 1972.
 Sources of Democracy. McGraw-Hill, 1973. 
 Karl Marx on American and the Civil War. McGraw-Hill, 1973.
The Living U.S. Constitution. With Jacob W. Landynski. Signet, 1953.
Nehru on World History. John Day, 1960. An adaptation of Glimpses of World History by Jawaharlal Nehru.

References

External links 

Saul K. Padover Papers, 1947-1972 University at Albany Libraries
Saul K. Padover papers 1944-1945  New York Public Library

Historians of the United States
American political scientists
American male journalists
American non-fiction writers
Wayne State University alumni
Yale University alumni
University of Chicago alumni
American civil servants
United States Army officers
United States Army personnel of World War II
Austrian Jews
Austrian emigrants to the United States
1905 births
1981 deaths
People of the Office of Strategic Services
20th-century American historians
Journalists from New York City
20th-century American male writers
Historians from New York (state)
20th-century political scientists